A Master of Science in Human Resource Development (abbreviated HRD or MSHRD) is a type of 
postgraduate academic master's degree awarded by universities in many countries. This degree is typically studied for in Human Resource Development and Human Resource Management. The key concepts include strategic human resource management, creatively studying and solving organisational problems and creating strategic alignment between human resource and organisational goals.

Curriculum Structure
The Master of Science in Human Resource Development is a one to three years Master Degree, depending on the program, some may even start with two-year preparation classes and covers various areas of human resource development.

Topics of study may include:

 business transformation
 Competence (human resources)
 Competency-based management
 Corporate Culture
 corporate social responsibilities
 Employment relations
 Employer branding
 Employee engagement
 human resource policies
 Human resource management system
 Human resource management in public administration
 Industrial relations
 Labor mobility
 Organizational behavior and human resources
 organizational culture
 performance appraisal
 Recruitment Process Outsourcing
 succession planning
 Strategic human resource planning
 training and development
 workplace diversity

Institutions with MS HRD Degree Programs
Institutions in the United States that have a Masters of Science in Human Resource Development Degree Program include:
Clemson University
Drexel University
New York University
Villanova University
Xavier University
University of Houston
Florida International University
Louisiana State University

See also 
 List of master's degrees
 List of human resource management associations
 Chief human resources officer
 Human resource consulting
 Human Resource Development Council
 Professional in Human Resources
 Society for Human Resource Management

References

Master's degrees
Business qualifications